The Perkins 6.372 is a diesel engine manufactured by Perkins Engines.  The designation 6.372 indicates six cylinders and 372 cubic inch (6.1 litre) capacity.  It is derived from the 6.354 (six cylinder, 354 in³ or 5.8L, L6 engine) bored out with a 0.100" larger bore.  It produces 112 horsepower in industrial form.

Turbocharged version
The T6.3724 is the turbocharged version of the above engine, and the "4" on the end of the nomenclature, indicates a DOT 4  (later, improved) series engine.

See also
 List of Perkins engines

Perkins engines

Diesel engines by model